The 44th annual Venice International Film Festival was held from 29 August to 9 September 1987.

Jury
The following people comprised the 1987 jury:
 Irene Papas (head of jury) (Greece)
 Sabine Azéma (France)
 John Bailey (USA)
 Anja Breien (Norway)
 Beatriz Guido (Argentina)
 Carlo Lizzani (Italy)
 Károly Makk (Hungary)
 Sergei Solovyov (Soviet Union)
 Vittorio Storaro (Italy)
 Ana Carolina (Brazil)
 Michael York (United Kingdom)
 Regina Ziegler (West Germany)

Official selection

In competition

Autonomous sections

Venice International Film Critics' Week
The following feature films were selected to be screened as In Competition for this section:
 True and Faithful Account (Relação fiel e verdadeira) by Margarida Gil (Portugal)
 Italian Night (Notte Italiana) by Carlo Mazzacurati (Italy)
 Killing Time (Poussière d'ange) by Edouard Niermans (France)
 The Burglar (Vzlomšcik) by Valerij Ogorodnikov (Soviet Union)
 Hidden City by Stephen Poliakoff (United Kingdom)
  (Drachenfutter) by Jan Schütte (West Germany, Switzerland)

Awards
Golden Lion:
Au revoir les enfants by Louis Malle
Special Jury Prize:
Hip hip hurra! by Kjell Grede
Silver Lion:
Maurice by James Ivory
Long Live the Lady! by Ermanno Olmi
Golden Osella:
 Best Screenplay - David Mamet  (House of Games)
 Best Cinematography - Sten Holmberg (Hip hip hurra!)
 Best Score - Richard Robbins (Maurice)
 Best Set Design - Nanà Cecchi & Luciano Ricceri (The Gold Rimmed Glasses)
Volpi Cup:
 Best Actor - Hugh Grant & James Wilby (Maurice)
 Best Actress - Kang Soo-yeon (The Surrogate Woman)
Honorable Mention:
 Season of Monsters (Miklós Jancsó)
The President of the Italian Senate's Gold Medal:
Plumbum, or The Dangerous Game (Vadim Abdrashitov)
Career Golden Lion:
Joseph L. Mankiewicz & Luigi Comencini
Golden Ciak
Best Film - House of Games (David Mamet)
Best Actor - Bernard Giraudeau (L'homme voilé)
Best Actress - Kelly McGillis (Made in Heaven)
Special Golden Ciak
Au revoir les enfants (Louis Malle)
'Commendatore al merito della Repubblica' Medal
Moritz de Hadeln'
FIPRESCI Prize
Anayurt Oteli (Ömer Kavur) 
Long Live the Lady! (Ermanno Olmi)
Critics Week - Vzlomshchik (Valeri Ogorodnikov)
OCIC Award
Au revoir les enfants (Louis Malle)
Honorable Mention - Le sourd dans la ville (Mireille Dansereau)
UNICEF Award
Au revoir les enfants (Louis Malle)
UNESCO Award
Drachenfutter (Jan Schütte)
Pasinetti Award
Best Film - House of Games (David Mamet)
Best Actor - Gian Maria Volonté (Un ragazzo di Calabria)
Best Actress - Melita Jurisic (The Tale of Ruby Rose)
Pietro Bianchi Award
Dino Risi
Elvira Notari Prize
The Tale of Ruby Rose (Roger Scholes)
Sergio Trasatti Award
Au revoir les enfants (Louis Malle)
Cinecritica Award
Drachenfutter (Jan Schütte)
House of Games (David Mamet)
Award of the Society for Psychology
Long Live the Lady! (Ermanno Olmi)

References

External links

Venice Film Festival 1987 Awards on IMDb

Venice
Venice
Venice
Venice Film Festival
Film
August 1987 events in Europe
September 1987 events in Europe